Sunlight is the debut studio album by Australian indie rock band Spacey Jane, released on 12 June 2020 through AWAL. Produced by Dave Parkin, it is the band's final release to include contributions by bassist Amelia Murray after her amicable departure in July 2019. The album debuted at number two on the ARIA Albums Chart and was voted Triple J's number one album of 2020. At the 2021 AIR Awards, Sunlight was nominated for Independent Album of the Year and Best Independent Rock Album. The album reached certified gold status in Australia in 2022.

Five of the album's tracks were voted into the Triple J Hottest 100, with "Good for You" at number 80 in 2019, and "Booster Seat" notably polling at number two in 2020, among "Skin" at number 15, "Straightfaced" at number 28 and "Weightless" at number 81.

Release
In November 2018, Spacey Jane released their second EP, In the Slight. They performed at Falls Festival 2018/2019 after winning the Triple J Unearthed Falls competition. "Good Grief" was released on 24 April 2019 as lead single of Sunlight, and was supported by the Good Grief Australian Tour. 

In July 2019, the group announced bassist Amelia Murray would be amicably leaving the band to pursue a career in medicine. She was soon replaced by Peppa Lane from Margaret River, who had studied at Western Australian Academy of Performing Arts and performed on double bass in her group, the Friendly Folk.

The next two singles "Good for You" and "Head Cold" followed in August and November, with the latter being supported by the nationwide Head Cold tour. "Good for You" polled at number 80 in the Triple J Hottest 100 of 2019 – the band's first appearance in the countdown.

On 20 December 2019, Spacey Jane signed with English record label AWAL, following a "breakout year" for the band, having become the fifth most played artist on Triple J Unearthed in 2019.

Three more singles were released in 2020. On 26 February 2020, the band officially announced the album's release via social media, alongside fourth single "Skin", a music video, and an Australia-wide tour. Of the announcement, lead vocalist Caleb Harper said the band was "so incredibly excited to finally be putting out our first ever album - it's been a long time in the making and we can barely keep still over it". Penultimate single "Straightfaced" was released in May, followed by "Booster Seat" on 7 June 2020, premiering on Richard Kingsmill's program on Triple J.

Promoting the album's release, the band held an online Zoom party with customers of the album on 19 June 2020.

Critical reception

Sunlight received "widespread acclaim". Ali Shutler of NME concluded that "as huge as Spacey Jane sound on Sunlight, it's never at the expense of their heartfelt honesty". Ben Malkin of music publication Indie Is Not a Genre called it a "fitting lockdown album, viscerally urgent yet constantly gazing in the mirror, searching for imperfections". He concluded the release is a "well-toned alt rock force, fit for radio but layered with emotional complexity".

Declan Byrne of Triple J summarised the album as navigating "past relationships, failures and lessons learned, but all through a bright, summery filter". The writer praised the balance of "breezy-sounding songs with emotional weight and heft", calling it "easily one of the smoothest indie rock rides you’ll enjoy from an Aussie guitar band this year".

Track listing
All tracks written by Caleb Harper, Kieran Lama, Peppa Lane and Ashton Le Cornu, unless otherwise noted.
Sunlight – Standard editionSunlight – Deluxe box set

Personnel
Musicians

 Caleb Harper – writing , lead vocals, guitar
 Ashton Hardman-Le Cornu – writing , lead guitar
 Kieran Lama – writing , drums
 Peppa Lane – writing , bass guitar, backing vocals
 Amelia Murray – writing 
 Will Toledo (Car Seat Headrest) – writing 

Technical

 Dave Parkin – producer
 William Bowden – mastering

Promotional

 Daniel Hildebrand – photography
 Garreth Pearse – deluxe edition design
 Matt Sav – cover photography

Charts

Weekly charts

Year-end charts

Certifications

Release history

References

External links
 

2020 debut albums
Spacey Jane albums
AWAL albums
Albums produced by Dave Parkin